Nebria currax is a species of ground beetle in the Nebriinae subfamily that is endemic to Canary Islands.

References

External links
Nebria currax at Fauna Europaea

currax
Beetles described in 1864
Endemic fauna of the Canary Islands